Forked Lake is a  lake in the Adirondack Park in New York,  southwest of the village of Long Lake.

The state operates 80 campsites accessible by boat or by foot, except for three which can accommodate up to  recreational vehicles. The camping fee is $18. The boat launch is suitable only for smaller boats.

Locking metal boxes, fire pits, picnic tables, and outhouses are available at each campsite. The lock boxes are for storing your food beyond the reach of the local bear population.  Some of the campsites have docks.

Forked Lake is home to Brook trout, largemouth bass, smallmouth bass, bullhead, yellow perch, pan fish and brown trout.  Maximum depth is 74 feet.  Other wildlife include loon, otters, beaver, owl, deer, ducks, and bear.

The lake is also part of the 740-mile Northern Forest Canoe Trail, which begins in Old Forge, NY and ends in Fort Kent, ME.

References

External links 
NY State DEC - Forked Lake
 http://www.reserveamerica.com/camping/Forked_Lake_Campground/r/campgroundDetails.do?contractCode=NY&parkId=641&topTabIndex=CampingSpot
Forked Lake Residents website

Adirondack Park
Lakes of New York (state)
Protected areas of Hamilton County, New York
Lakes of Hamilton County, New York
Northern Forest Canoe Trail